Saint Eleutherius of Rocca d'Arce (12th century?) was, according to tradition, an English pilgrim who died at Rocca d'Arce and was afterwards venerated as a saint. Tradition also makes him a brother of Saints Grimwald and Fulk (possibly Saint Grimoaldus and Saint Fulk, both also according to tradition 12th century Englishmen who relocated to and died in Italy). Little is known about him.

References 

Christian saints in unknown century
Medieval English saints
Year of death missing
Year of birth unknown